Panchpara or Panch Para is a village located in Ward 2 of South Shahbazpur Union, in Barlekha Upazila, Moulvibazar District, Bangladesh.

The village has a population of 2,399 and consists mostly of Bengali Muslims of Sylheti descent. There are three mosques in the village and these are: West Panchpara Jame Masjid, East Panchpara Jame Masjid and Central Panchpara Jame Masjid.

See also
 Divisions of Bangladesh
 Districts of Bangladesh
 List of villages in Bangladesh
 Upazilas of Bangladesh

References

Villages in Maulvibazar District
Barlekha Upazila